Debra Lynn Boutin is an American mathematician, the Samuel F. Pratt Professor of Mathematics at Hamilton College, where she chairs the mathematics department. Her research involves the symmetries of graphs and distinguishing colorings of graphs.

Education and career
Boutin is a graduate of Chicopee Comprehensive High School in Massachusetts.
After high school, Boutin took a ten-year hiatus from higher education, including serving for four years in the United States Navy, working as a secretary, and raising a child. She restarted her education, supported by the G.I. Bill, by studying data processing at Springfield Technical Community College in Massachusetts. Next, Boutin went to Smith College as an Ada Comstock Scholar. She graduated Phi Beta Kappa and summa cum laude in 1991 with a bachelor's degree in mathematics. She completed her Ph.D. in mathematics in 1998 at Cornell University. Her doctoral dissertation, Centralizers of Finite Subgroups of Automorphisms and Outer Automorphisms of Free Groups, was supervised by Karen Vogtmann.

After a one-year visiting position at Trinity College (Connecticut), she joined Hamilton College as an assistant professor in 1999. She was tenured as an associate professor in 2005 and promoted to full professor in 2010.

Recognition
Hamilton College named Boutin as the Samuel F. Pratt Professor of Mathematics in 2019.

References

External links
Home page

Year of birth missing (living people)
Living people
American mathematicians
American women mathematicians
Smith College alumni
Cornell University alumni
Hamilton College (New York) faculty